Backwoods Home Magazine is a quarterly American magazine. It was founded in 1989 in a garage in Ventura, California, by Dave Duffy and his seven-year-old daughter, Annie. After publication of the second issue, Duffy met Ilene Myers, who became his wife and partner-in-publication. Backwoods Home remains family-owned. It is based in Philomath, Oregon.

Backwoods Home's articles and columns emphasize practical skills and projects for rural living. Typical topics include building your own structures, growing crops, earning a living in the country, frugal living, cooking and baking, raising animals, harvesting wild foods, homegrown energy, emergency preparedness, self-healthcare, and buying and using firearms. The magazine also features historic and scientific "debunking" articles by long-time senior editor, John Silveira. Backwoods Home is also known for its libertarian and libertarian-conservative editorial viewpoints.

History and philosophy 
Dave Duffy, then a technical writer and former journalist, and his seven-year-old daughter Annie started the magazine with no money other than an occasional freelance paycheck in 1989. They initially published it from a garage in Ventura, in Southern California. Duffy's original concept was for a book called Build a Backwoods Home for Under $10,000. The book was to be based on his experience constructing an off-grid home in the Siskiyou mountains of Oregon, to which he was commuting every few months.

He started the magazine as a means of advertising the proposed book. The first issue, with a print run of 6,000, came out in October 1989 and was distributed free and by hand by Duffy and Annie. A few months later, the publication was picked up by a national distributor, American Distribution Services of Northbrook, Illinois (now defunct). The book was never completed.

Backwoods Home has been called "what Mother Earth News used to be" – that is, a no-frills, back-to-basics resource for country dwellers and those hoping to move to the country. At the time of Backwoods Home's founding, Mother Earth had become a more "slick" publication. However, Duffy says he had never heard of Mother Earth News at that time, and that among his chief inspirations were scientific publications from the Middle Ages.

Duffy has said, "Although the emphasis has always been on self-reliance, I rode the environmental wagon a bit back then to try and attract subscribers, but quickly gave it up and followed my Libertarian leanings. My model was a type of scientific journal from the Middle Ages ... that mixed how-to advice like wine and bread making with scientific articles. I decided to mix self-reliant articles with freedom articles. It was what interested me. It was both interesting to me – and I felt was important to everyone – to both understand how to do things for yourself and to understand how freedom worked. John Silveira, my friend since age 20, was an important element of this mix, as he had the intellect and research ability to write the critical freedom articles. The backbone of BHM has always been, and is today, the how-to article."

The magazine has for many years had a consistent circulation of 41,000, of which approximately 36,000 is subscription and 5,000 newsstand sales. The economic troubles of late 2008 and 2009 led to a substantial increase in visits to its website.

The print version of the magazine was discontinued in 2018 and was only available on Amazon Kindle. 

The magazine was brought back to the print world in 2019 by Duffy's youngest son, Sam Duffy, under the auspices of Self-Reliance Publications LLC.

"Safety Not Guaranteed" classified ad 
In the September/October 1997 issue of Backwoods Home, Senior Editor John Silveira wrote a joke ad as filler for the magazine's classified ad section:
Wanted: Somebody to go back in time with me. This is not a joke.  P.O. Box 93022 Oakview, CA. You'll get paid after we get back. Must bring your own weapons. Safety not guaranteed. I have only done this once before.

This issue of the magazine also featured a fake personals ad using the same post office box, Silveria's own mailing address, which Silveria thought would give away the joke.

The ad has been copied repeatedly, was featured on The Tonight Show with Jay Leno, and inspired an internet meme. The fake ad was adapted into the 2012 film Safety Not Guaranteed.

Notes

External links
 Backwoods Home Magazine website

Bimonthly magazines published in the United States
Gold Beach, Oregon
Libertarian publications
Lifestyle magazines published in the United States
Magazines established in 1989
Magazines published in California
Magazines published in Oregon